Shelby County High School is a secondary school located in the city of Columbiana in the U.S. state of Alabama. It is a part of Shelby County Schools.

Athletics
Shelby County High School's athletic teams are known as the Wildcats, and their colors are cardinal and white. Football games are played at Charles "PaPa" McCombs Stadium. Shelby County High School was a charter member of the Alabama High School Athletic Association, and currently plays in Class 5A. From 1961 to 1966, the football team won forty-five consecutive games, which is the sixth longest streak of most consecutive games without a loss in state history.

Notable alumni
Jason Aaron, comic book writer
Robert J. Bentley, the 53rd Governor of Alabama graduated from SCHS in 1961.
Kevin Guy, head coach for the Arizona Rattlers of the Arena Football League

References

External links 
 Official website

Public high schools in Alabama
Schools in Shelby County, Alabama